The Art Directors Guild Award for Outstanding Production Design for a Half Hour Single-Camera Television Series is an award handed out annually by the Art Directors Guild. It was introduced at the Art Directors Guilds' 13th annual honors, in 2009, after being combined with regular, one-hour series for the first four ceremonies (including with miniseries and television films for the first), and multi-camera series after that.

Winners and nominations
"*" indicates a half hour single-camera series in years where categories were combined.

1990s
Excellence in Production Design Award - Television

Excellence in Production Design Award - Television Series

2000s
Excellence in Production Design Award - Multi-Camera Television Series

Excellence in Production Design Award - Half Hour Single-Camera Series

2010s

2020s

Programs with multiple wins
Totals include wins for all previous incarnations of award.

3 wins
 Mad TV

2 wins
 GLOW
 Modern Family
 Weeds
 What We Do in the Shadows
 Will & Grace

Programs with multiple nominations
Totals include wins for all previous incarnations of award.

6 nominations
 Modern Family

5 nominations
 Silicon Valley
 Veep

4 nominations
 30 Rock
 Will & Grace

3 nominations
 Californication
 GLOW
 How I Met Your Mother
 Star Trek: Voyager
 Two and a Half Men
 Weeds

2 nominations
 Arrested Development
 Community
 Frasier
 The Good Place
 The Last Man on Earth
 Life with Bonnie
 The Office
 Parks and Recreation
 Titus
 Transparent
 What We Do in the Shadows
 The X-Files

References

 
American film awards
American television awards
International Alliance of Theatrical Stage Employees
Awards established in 1996